King Alfred and the Anglo Saxons is a 2013 documentary in three parts written and presented by Michael Wood.

Episodes

Experts 
Janet Nelson

Helena Hamerow

Rory Naismith

References

External links

2010s British documentary television series
2013 British television series debuts
2013 British television series endings
BBC television documentaries about medieval history